"I Be U Be" is a song written by Brad Rempel and Jenson Vaughan and recorded by Canadian country music duo High Valley for their fifth studio album, Dear Life (2016). The song was first released digitally on November 11, 2016 as the fifth and final promotional single supporting the album. It was serviced to Canadian country radio on February 27, 2017 as the album's second Canadian single and third overall single. "I Be U Be" is the first single available on both regional track listings for Dear Life.

Content
"I Be U Be" is a country song with influences of folk, bluegrass, and Americana. The song's lyrics describe an "ideal love" reciprocated through back-and-forth assertions of support.

Critical reception
In a review of Dear Life, Matt Bjorke of Roughstock wrote that "I Be U Be" is "a song with an interesting melody and... what makes the whole song work is the band's harmonies and strong, heartfelt lyrics." Laura Hostelley of Sounds Like Nashville commended the song's "strong imagery" and wrote that the song's percussion-heavy sound "might become a signature in their career."

Commercial performance
"I Be U Be" entered the Canada Country chart dated March 25, 2017 at number 38. It reached the top 10 in its sixth week on the chart, becoming the group's eighth consecutive top-10 single. The song reached the number one position on the chart dated May 27, 2017; this makes it the group's most successful radio single to date, surpassing the  3 peak of "Come on Down", and first number one. "I Be U Be" entered the Canadian Hot 100 chart at number 92 in the chart dated May 27, 2017.

Music video
The official music video for "I Be U Be" premiered through CMT Canada on April 6, 2017.

Charts

Year-end charts

Certifications

Release history

References

2016 songs
2017 singles
High Valley songs
Atlantic Records singles
Warner Records singles
Songs written by Jenson Vaughan
Songs written by Brad Rempel